HEC syndrome is a syndrome characterized by hydrocephalus, endocardial fibroelastosis and cataracts.

References

External links 

 

Syndromes affecting the eye
Syndromes affecting the heart
Syndromes affecting the nervous system